The Rich List is an American television game show on Fox, that aired its only episode on 1 November 2006 at 9 pm ET / PT. The show was then cancelled two days later by Fox after rating poorly in comparison to its slot competitors, Lost (on ABC) and CBS's Criminal Minds. It was produced by the British company 12 Yard, whose main creative team devised and produced Weakest Link and Dog Eat Dog. It featured competitors making lists of things, such as ABBA songs or Steven Spielberg movies, with the winning team being the one that could name the most. British television presenter Eamonn Holmes was the host.

In the episode, Holmes stated, "Our top prize is so big...well, we don't have a top prize!"

Despite its failure, two and a half years later, a revised version aired on GSN under the title The Money List, with Fred Roggin hosting.

Gameplay
Two teams of two players each competed. The teams were placed in separate soundproof isolation booths, with audio that could be turned on or off by the host, much like the Twenty-One game show. He would announce the category for the list, such as "Tom Cruise Movies" or "Top 50 Broadway Shows of All Time," and the teams would take turns bidding on how many they thought they could name.

The host would switch the audio on and off between booths as the bidding continued, then turn them both on when one team dared the other to fulfill the bid. That team would then need to come up with that many correct answers in a row to win the list. One mistake would award it to their opponents.

The first team to win two lists won the game and went on to the bonus round.

Tiebreaker
If each team won one list, a sudden death tiebreaker was played. The host would give the category, both booths were switched on, and the teams took turns giving one answer at a time. To win the list and the game, one team would have to give a correct answer while their opponents missed.

Bonus round (The Rich List)
The winning team was given a new category by Holmes and had the chance to supply up to 15 right answers. Winnings increased after every third one as shown in the table below.

If a wrong answer was given at any time, the team would lose all accumulated money for that bonus round, but previous winnings were safe. After every third answer, they could choose to stop (keeping all money won so far) or go on. Regardless of the outcome, they would have returned to play against a new pair of opponents; only a loss in the main game could have eliminated the champions.

Contestants and winnings

Past lists

International versions

 Fox promos for The Rich List in the weeks leading up to its debut had mentioned that the show was the most addicting game show to come out of the UK since Who Wants to Be a Millionaire?. However, despite being created by a British group, The Rich List had not then been televised in Britain (the US version was first to air).  Before the US version was announced, Holmes did host a pilot for ITV, but the show was not picked up. It later aired as a tie-in for the National Lottery on BBC One under the title Who Dares Wins, hosted by Nick Knowles.
 In Australia, Seven Network picked up the rights to the show and announced plans to air a local version before the US version premiered. The program is hosted by Deal or No Deal host Andrew O'Keefe. The pilot episode was taped on 18 October 2006.  The show began taping episodes for air on 11 December 2006 and auditions for contestants for the show continue.  The money amounts for the final round are the same as on the US show, except in Australian dollars. The show premiered on 29 January 2007.
 In Germany, The Rich List is produced for the German TV channel Sat.1. Kai Pflaume is the host. The format and rules appear to be identical to those on the US and Australian versions, although the prize values for the bonus list are less (the top prize for completing the bonus list is €100,000).  The show premiered as a three-night event on 26 May 2007, and will now run Saturdays and Sundays at 7:15 pm.
 In New Zealand, The Rich List is produced for TVNZ and airs on TV ONE. Applications for the show were opened at the beginning of April 2007. The grand prize for completing the bonus list is NZ$50,000. The host is Jason Gunn.
 In North Macedonia, Листа за 300 (List For 300) is produced for Sitel. The show has started airing in April 2019 and the host of the first season was famous Macedonian actor Dejan Lilikj. For the second season there was change of host and Marko Noveski is host of the show. In the first season, the main prize was 300,000 denars (around €5,000), and after it the top prize was decreased to €300.
 An Irish version, known as The Money List, was announced by RTÉ in 2023, and will air on RTÉ One later in the year.

Cancellation
After only one episode with a 1.5/4 rating (4 million viewers), the show was pulled from its time slot, to be replaced by a special new episode of The O.C. the following week, which struggled the next night during its season premiere. The Rich List became the second US program in the 2006 calendar year (after ABC's Emily's Reasons Why Not in January), and the first of the 2006–07 television season, to be cancelled after a single telecast.

Revival
The show earned a revival for GSN under the title The Money List, and premiered on 13 June 2009. Pilot episodes of the series were taped in London on the set of Who Dares Wins at The London Studios from 27 to 30 August 2008 with sports commentator Fred Roggin as host. The top prize for this version is US $50,000, which is the same top prize amount as the UK and New Zealand versions (the only difference is that the UK's version is in pounds sterling, while New Zealand's version is in New Zealand dollars.) The revival ended on 15 August 2009 after one season.

References

External links
 
 GSF-What's New in Game Shows-The Rich List
 Zap2It article
 TVSquad Article

Fox Broadcasting Company original programming
2006 American television series debuts
2000s American game shows
2006 American television series endings
Television series canceled after one episode
Television series by ITV Studios